Federal elections were held in Switzerland on 18 October 2015 for the National Council and the first round of elections to the Council of States, with runoff elections to the Council of States being held in various cantons until 22 November.

Results showed a shift, due to voter concerns regarding refugee immigration, to the right and increased support for the three largest parties, with the strong showing of Swiss People's Party and FDP.The Liberals possibly affecting future reforms of energy, social security and tax issues, as well as the make-up of the seven-member government.

The Swiss People's Party won a record number of seats, taking a third of the 200-seat lower house. The SVP received the highest proportion of votes of any Swiss political party since 1919, when proportional representation was first introduced, and it received more seats in the National Council than any other political party since 1963, when the number of seats was set at 200.

The federal election was followed by the 2015 Swiss Federal Council election on 9 December 2015, where the SVP won a second seat on the Federal Council.

Electoral system
The 200 members of the National Council were elected by plurality in six single-member constituencies, and by proportional representation in 20 multi-member constituencies, with the 26 constituencies being the 26 cantons. The elections were held using the open list system where voters could cross out names on party lists, with voters also able to split their vote between parties (a system known as panachage) or draw up their own list on a blank ballot. Seats are allocated using the Hagenbach-Bischoff system.

The 46 members of the Council of States were elected in 20 two-seat constituencies (representing the 20 full cantons) and six single-member constituencies (representing the six half-cantons). In Jura and Neuchâtel the elections were held using proportional representation. In the other cantons, councilors are elected through an up to two-round system of voting. In the first round of voting, candidates must obtain an absolute majority of the vote in order to be elected. If no candidate receives an absolute majority in the first round of voting then a second round is held in which a simple plurality is sufficient to be elected. The top two finishing candidates are elected in the second round.

Compulsory voting was in force in the canton of Schaffhausen for both elections.

Campaign
The parties contesting the elections were:

Opinion polls

Results
Global media commented on the gains of the Swiss People's Party, linking it to concerns of the electorate on the European migrant crisis. Combined, right-of-centre parties received a slim 101-seat majority in the National Council. While the right-of-centre SVP and FDP made gains, centrist and left-of-centre parties lost seats in the National Council. The FDP increased its share of the popular vote for the first time since the 1979 federal election.

In the Swiss capital Bern, a group of activists in favour of settling refugees held a demonstration on the day of the election, which is prohibited by law. A total of 110 were arrested.

The election results elicited various responses from the Swiss media, such as that the election represented "a return to normality" after a period when the legislative makeup was not as clear, or that it represented "a divided country." Newspapers, both in Switzerland and in other countries, also noted the SVP's historic gains.

National Council

Council of States

By canton

Aftermath
The 2015 federal election was followed by the 2015 Swiss Federal Council election on 9 December 2015.

Owing to the results of the federal election, Federal Councillor Eveline Widmer-Schlumpf, a member of the Conservative Democratic Party (BDP), announced she would not run for re-election, as the Swiss People's Party (SVP) won a record percentage of the vote, while her own party decreased its share. The SVP was widely expected to fill her seat in the election, and it chose Thomas Aeschi (Zug), Guy Parmelin (Vaud) and Norman Gobbi (Ticino) as candidates for the seat, with Aeschi being the favorite at the time.

Guy Parmelin, of the SVP, was ultimately elected on 9 December. Parmelin, a farmer and winegrower from Bursins in canton Vaud, was the first member of the Federal Council who is also a member of the Swiss People's Party from the French-speaking part of Switzerland.

There was a minor cabinet reshuffle after the election, as newly elected Parmelin was selected to become head of the Federal Department of Defence, Civil Protection and Sports, replacing fellow SVP-member Ueli Maurer, who became head of the Federal Department of Finance. The SVP gained its second seat in the Federal Council, which it had lost in 2008, when the newly created BDP split from the SVP.

References

External links

Federal elections in Switzerland
Federal
Federal
Switzerland